Mariana Alejandra González Oliva Gulla (born March 12, 1976 in Buenos Aires) is a field hockey player from Argentina, who twice won a bronze medal with the national women's hockey team at the Summer Olympics in 2004 and 2008, the World Cup in 2002, two  Champions Trophy (2001) and (2008), two Pan American Games (2003) and (2007) and the Pan American Cup in 2001.

External links
 
 The Official Website of the Beijing 2008 Olympic Games
 Confederación Argentina de Hockey Official site of the Argentine Hockey Confederation 
 

Living people
Argentine female field hockey players
Las Leonas players
Olympic field hockey players of Argentina
Field hockey players at the 1996 Summer Olympics
Field hockey players at the 2004 Summer Olympics
Field hockey players at the 2008 Summer Olympics
Olympic bronze medalists for Argentina
Field hockey players from Buenos Aires
1976 births
Olympic medalists in field hockey
Medalists at the 2004 Summer Olympics
Medalists at the 2008 Summer Olympics
Pan American Games gold medalists for Argentina
Pan American Games medalists in field hockey
SCHC players
Field hockey players at the 2003 Pan American Games
Field hockey players at the 2007 Pan American Games
Medalists at the 2007 Pan American Games
Medalists at the 2003 Pan American Games
21st-century Argentine women